The Treasure Valley Rollergirls (TVR) is a women's flat track roller derby league based in Boise, Idaho. Founded in 2006, Treasure Valley is a member of the Women's Flat Track Derby Association (WFTDA).

History and organization
Treasure Valley was formed in February 2006, shortly after the television series Rollergirls began airing, and played its first season the following year.  In January 2008, it faced the top teams in the Northwest in a tournament hosted by the Rat City Rollergirls.  Around this point, it had four teams: the B-Town Battalion, Cell Block B, the Devil's Darlings and the Derailers, but these were subsequently disbanded shortly after the omnibus league moved from its grass roots beginnings at Expo Idaho in Garden City to Century Link Arena in downtown Boise.

The league was accepted into the WFTDA Apprentice Program in April 2010, and became a full member of the WFTDA in September 2011. Treasure Valley began hosting a tournament in its own right, the annual SpudTown Knockdown, an international annual two-day double bracket elimination tournament (typically held at what is now Century Link Arena in downtown Boise over the Labor Day weekend). Characterized as "the Best of the Rest of the West," as it took place prior to the WFTDA's annual Playoff tournaments, the fourth annual SpudTown Knockdown, in a return to the TVR's roots, was held at Expo Idaho on July 20–21, 2013.

WFTDA competition
Treasure Valley has competed at WFTDA Division 2 Playoffs numerous times, most recently at the Division 2 Playoffs and Championship in 2017 as the #13 seed in Pittsburgh, where they lost both their games to finish out of the medals.

Rankings

 CR = consolation round

References

Sports in Boise, Idaho
Roller derby leagues established in 2006
Roller derby leagues in Idaho
Women's Flat Track Derby Association Division 2
2006 establishments in Idaho